The Ligue 2 season 2007–08 was the sixty-sixth since its establishment, and started in August 2007. The fixtures were announced in June 2007.

FC Metz, the champions of Ligue 2, SM Caen, and RC Strasbourg were promoted to France's top division Ligue 1. Whereas, Troyes AC, CS Sedan, and FC Nantes were relegated to Ligue 2. The first matches of the season were played on 27 July 2007, and the season ended on 16 May 2008. The new Ligue 2 champions were crowned on 2 May 2008 when Le Havre AC drew with Montpellier HSC following FC Nantes's loss to Amiens SC that same day. As champions, Le Havre will be promoted to France's highest football division Ligue 1 for the upcoming 2008-09 season. For finishing in 2nd place and 3rd, both FC Nantes and Grenoble Foot 38 achieved promotion as well.

The relegation places were filled by FC Gueugnon, who were relegated after losing to AC Ajaccio on 18 April 2008. FC Libourne-Saint-Seurin, who were relegated after to CS Sedan on 2 May 2008 and Chamois Niortais FC, who were relegated on the final day after losing to US Boulogne who were occupying the last relegation place coming into the final day.

20 participating teams

 AC Ajaccio
 Amiens SC
 Angers SCO
 US Boulogne
 SC Bastia
 Stade Brestois
 LB Châteauroux
 Clermont Foot
 Dijon FCO
 Grenoble Foot 38
 FC Gueugnon
 En Avant Guingamp
 Le Havre AC
 FC Libourne-Saint-Seurin
 Montpellier HSC
 FC Nantes Atlantique
 Chamois Niortais FC
 Stade de Reims
 CS Sedan Ardennes
 Troyes AC

League table

Results

Top goalscorers
Last updated May 16, 2008

The top goalscorer was awarded to Le Havre AC's Guillaume Hoarau finishing with a stunning 28 goals averaging a goal per 118 minutes.

Managers

Stadia
Last updated August 8, 2008

References

External links
French League official website

Ligue 2 seasons
French
2